Gestation III is a 1990 wooden sculpture by Baile Oakes, installed in Santa Monica, California's Palisades Park, in the United States. The sculpture measures approximately 10 ft. 7 in. x 11 ft. 8 in. x 8 ft. 6, and was surveyed by the Smithsonian Institution's 'Save Outdoor Sculpture!' program in 1994.

According to the Santa Monica Mirror, the work "aligns visually with the Northern Hemisphere’s winter solstice sunset" and "draws a small group to watch the winter solstice sun set".

See also 

 1990 in art
 List of public art in Santa Monica, California

References 

1990 sculptures
Outdoor sculptures in Santa Monica, California
Wooden sculptures in the United States